Owli Beyk (also Romanized as Owlī Beyk; also known as Olībeyg and Owlī Beyg) is a village in Shivanat Rural District, Afshar District, Khodabandeh County, Zanjan Province, Iran. At the 2006 census, its population was 762, in 156 families.

References 

Populated places in Khodabandeh County